Atymna querci is a species of treehoppers in the family Membracidae.

Gallery

References 

Membracidae